In optics the Smith–Helmholtz invariant is an invariant quantity for paraxial beams propagating through an optical system. Given an object at height  and an axial ray passing through the same axial position as the object with angle , the invariant is defined by
,
where  is the refractive index. For a given optical system and specific choice of object height and axial ray, this quantity is invariant under refraction. Therefore, at the th conjugate image point with height  and refracted axial ray with angle  in medium with index of refraction  we have . Typically the two points of most interest are the object point and the final image point.

The Smith–Helmholtz invariant has a close connection with the Abbe sine condition. The Smith–Helmholtz invariant implies that the lateral magnification,  is constant if and only if the sine condition is satisfied.

Applying the invariant to the object and image points implies the product of these magnifications is given by

The Smith–Helmholtz invariant is closely related to the Lagrange invariant and the optical invariant. The Smith–Helmholtz is the optical invariant restricted to conjugate image planes.

See also
 Etendue
 Lagrange invariant
 Abbe sine condition

References

Geometrical optics